Cherdonna Shinatra is the stage name of Jody Kuehner (born ), a Seattle-based, American dancer, drag queen and performance artist. Kuehner won the Stranger Genius Award in Performance in 2015.

Career

Performance style 
Kuehner has been called a "female impersonator impersonator" and describes her own performance as Cherdonna as "a female-bodied person, presenting as a male-bodied person, presenting as a female". She has been mistaken for a man by some audience members who don't expect to see the "exaggerat[ed] femininity" displayed by a drag persona to have a female body. After a performance in Seattle she had her breasts grabbed by a person who expected to find a prosthetic, and she performed onstage several times with a male partner before he realized she was not also male.

Keuhner incorporates many elements into her performances, including dance, theater, drag, burlesque, glitter, celebrity impersonations, audience interaction, and clowning.

Performances and achievements 
Kuehner was part of a 2014–2015 multidisciplinary exhibition at Frye Art Museum in Seattle. In 2017 she was an Artist Trust Fellowship recipient, and the 2017 Henry Art Gallery Artist in Residence.

She was a member of the Pat Graney Dance Company from 2007 to 2016 and assisted in Graney's FTK Prison Project. Kuehner is a performer with the touring cabaret and burlesque company Kitten n Lou Presents as a member of The Atomic Bombshells.

Keuhner has presented three solo performance art shows as Cherdonna that are a part of a larger collection of shows which she calls one great, bright, brittle alltogetherness. The first of these was simply called one great, bright, brittle alltogetherness and was performed at Velocity Dance Center in 2016. Then she produced Clock that Mug or Dusted in 2016 which premiered at Velocity Dance Center in 2016. The third installment was Kissing Like Babies which premiered at On the Boards in Seattle in October 2017.

Dance instruction 
Kuehner was artist in residence and instructor at Velocity Dance Center in 2014.

Personal life 
Kuehner describes herself as queer.

References

Further reading

External links

1980s births
Living people
American drag queens
LGBT people from Washington (state)
Artists from Seattle
American dancers
Queer women
Queer artists
21st-century LGBT people